Barry Seabourne (birth registered first ¼ 1947) is an English former professional rugby league footballer who played in the 1960s and 1970s, and coached in the 1980s and 1990s.

Background
Seabourne' s birth was registered in Leeds, West Riding of Yorkshire, England.

Playing career

International honours
Barry Seabourne won caps for England while at Leeds in 1970 against Wales, and France, and won a cap for Great Britain while at Leeds in 1970 against New Zealand.

Challenge Cup Final appearances
Barry Seabourne played  in Leeds' 11-10 victory over Wakefield Trinity in the 1968 Challenge Cup "Watersplash" Final during the 1967-68 season at Wembley Stadium, London on Saturday 11 May 1968, played  in the 7-21 defeat by Leigh in the 1971 Challenge Cup Final during the 1970–71 season at Wembley Stadium, London on Saturday 15 May 1971, in front of a crowd of 85,514, and played  in Bradford Northern's 14-33 defeat by Featherstone Rovers in the 1973 Challenge Cup Final during the 1972–73 season at Wembley Stadium, London on Saturday 12 May 1973, in front of a crowd of 72,395.

County Cup Final appearances
Barry Seabourne played  in Leeds' 2-18 defeat by Wakefield Trinity in the 1964 Yorkshire County Cup Final during the 1964–65 season at Fartown Ground, Huddersfield on Saturday 31 October 1964, and played , and was man of the match winning the White Rose Trophy in the 22-11 victory over Castleford in the 1968 Yorkshire County Cup Final during the 1968–69 season at Belle Vue, Wakefield on Saturday 19 October 1968.

Player's No.6 Trophy Final appearances
Barry Seabourne played , and was man of the match in Bradford Northern's 3-2 victory over Widnes in the 1974–75 Player's No.6 Trophy Final during the 1974–75 season at Wilderspool Stadium, Warrington on Saturday 25 January 1975.

Coaching career

County Cup Final appearances
Barry Seabourne was the coach in Bradford Northern's 11-2 victory over Castleford in the 1987 Yorkshire County Cup Final during the 1987–88 season at Elland Road, Leeds on Saturday 31 October 1987.

References

External links
(archived by web.archive.org) Profile at leedsrugby.dnsupdate.co.uk
Photograph "Barry Seabourne gets theball out" at rlhp.co.uk
Photograph "Blacker gets the ball away" at rlhp.co.uk
Photograph "Daylight training" at rlhp.co.uk
Photograph "Barry Seaborne - The Schemer" at rlhp.co.uk
Photograph "1987/88 Team Photo" at rlhp.co.uk
Photograph "Seabourne leads his men" at rlhp.co.uk
Photograph "Seabourne touches down" at rlhp.co.uk
Photograph "Barry Seabourne, architect" at rlhp.co.uk
Photograph "Joe Phillips memorial trophy team 1975" at rlhp.co.uk
Photograph "The National Anthem" at rlhp.co.uk
Photograph "The teams take to the field" at rlhp.co.uk
Photograph "Barry Seabourne about to pass" at rlhp.co.uk
Photograph "Seabourne passes" at rlhp.co.uk
Photograph "Barry and Peter Seabourne" at rlhp.co.uk
Rugby Cup Final 1968

1947 births
Living people
Bradford Bulls coaches
Bradford Bulls players
England national rugby league team captains
England national rugby league team players
English rugby league coaches
English rugby league players
Great Britain national rugby league team players
Huddersfield Giants coaches
Keighley Cougars coaches
Leeds Rhinos players
Rugby league players from Leeds
Rugby league halfbacks